Jarne Vrijsen (born 21 March 1996) is a Belgian footballer who currently plays for Belgian club Genk. He plays as a left back.

Career 
Vrijsen is a youth exponent from K.R.C. Genk which he joined from Kabouters Opglabbeek as a U7 player. He made his Belgian Pro League debut at 13 December 2014 in a 3–0 home win against K.V. Kortrijk. He replaced Christian Kabasele after 83 minutes.

References

External links

Belgian footballers
Belgian expatriate footballers
1996 births
Living people
K.R.C. Genk players
MVV Maastricht players
K.S.K. Heist players
K. Patro Eisden Maasmechelen players
Eerste Divisie players
Belgian Pro League players
Belgian Third Division players
Sportspeople from Genk
Footballers from Limburg (Belgium)
Association football defenders
Belgian expatriate sportspeople in the Netherlands
Expatriate footballers in the Netherlands